

The MSrE M-21 Harag (Hungarian: "Fury") was an aerobatics aircraft built in Hungary in 1936, sometimes known as the Szegedy M-21 after one of its designers, József Szegedy. It was a conventional biplane design with single-bay staggered wings of equal span braced by N-struts. The pilot sat in an open cockpit, and the tailwheel undercarriage featured divided main units. Only a single example was built.

Specifications

Notes

References

 
 

1930s Hungarian sport aircraft
MSrE aircraft
Biplanes
Single-engined tractor aircraft
Aircraft first flown in 1936